James Wallace Robinson (November 26, 1826 – June 28, 1898) was an American lawyer and politician who served one term as a U.S. Representative from Ohio from 1873 to 1875.

Life and career
Born in the township of Darby, near Unionville Center, Ohio, Robinson attended the common schools and Marysville Academy.  He was graduated from Jefferson College, Canonsburg, Pennsylvania, in 
1848. He studied law first with Otway Curry, and graduated from Cincinnati Law School in 1851.

He was admitted to the bar in the latter year and commenced practice in London, Ohio, partnering with Curry.
He served as prosecuting attorney of Union County for two terms, elected as a Whig.
He moved to Marysville, Ohio, in 1855.
He served as member of the State house of representatives 1860–1862, and in 1864 was elected to fill an unexpired term.

Congress 
Robinson was elected as a Republican to the Forty-third Congress (March 4, 1873 – March 3, 1875).
He was an unsuccessful candidate for reelection in 1874 to the Forty-fourth Congress.

He resumed the practice of his profession.

Death
He died in Marysville, Ohio, June 28, 1898.
He was interred in Oakdale Cemetery.

Private life
Robinson was a Presbyterian, and an elder in the church beginning in 1855. He was a member of the Board of Trustees of the College of Wooster, which conferred a LL.D. on him in 1896. He was married to Mary J. Cassil of Marysville, and had two children and died in 1894. In 1896 he married Mary E. Kent of Rome, New York.

His nephew, James E. Robinson, was an associate justice of the Supreme Court of Ohio and a maternal great-grandfather of U.S. President George W. Bush. Thus, James Wallace Robinson is a great-great-granduncle of a President of the United States.

Sources

1826 births
1898 deaths
People from Union County, Ohio
Members of the Ohio House of Representatives
Washington & Jefferson College alumni
University of Cincinnati College of Law alumni
County district attorneys in Ohio
Ohio lawyers
Ohio Whigs
19th-century American politicians
Burials in Ohio
People from Marysville, Ohio
19th-century American lawyers
Republican Party members of the United States House of Representatives from Ohio